Worongary is a suburb in the City of Gold Coast, Queensland, Australia.

Geography
Most of the eastern boundary of Worongary follows the Pacific Motorway.

There is a large area of production forestry in the north-west of the suburb. The north-eastern part of the suburb is predominantly residential at suburb densities. The middle and south of the suburb is mostly rural residential with larger blocks of land, typically .

History
The name Worongary is derived from an Aboriginal word Whorrongary, meaning vine or flight of a pigeon.

The Worongary State School opened on 1 February 1993.

Hinterland Baptist Church was established in 1995. Its timber church building was relocated from another site.

Heritage listings

Worongary has a number of heritage-listed sites, including:
 8 Worongary Road: former Schmidt Farmhouse

Education 

Worongary State School is a government primary (Prep-6) school for boys and girls at Delta Cove Drive. In 2018, the school had an enrolment of 699 students with 49 teachers (43 full-time equivalent) and 29 non-teaching staff (18 full-time equivalent). It includes a special education program.

There are no secondary schools in Worongary. The nearest government secondary schools are Nerang State High School in Nerang to the north and Robina State High School in Robina to the south-east.

Amenities 
Despite the name, Mudgeeraba Showgrounds are at 115 Mudgeeraba Road in Worongary.

The Springbrook Mudgeeraba branch of the Queensland Country Women's Association meets at the Bill Deacon Pavilion at the Mudgeeraba Showgrounds.

Hinterland Baptist Church is at 405 Hinkler Drive.

The Church of Jesus Christ of Latter Day Saints is at 74 Mudgeeraba Road.

Parks 
There are a number of parks in the area:

 Alice Bowden Reserve
 Alkira Park

 Charles Kurz Drive Reserves

 Darryl Randal Drive Parklands

 Delta Reserve

 Dorrigo Drainage Reserve

 Explorers Way Northern Linear Park

 Explorers Way Southern Linear Park

 Fred Cass Family Park

 Graham Dillon Park

 Handel Avenue Reserve

 Harry Mills Drive Reserve

 Incline Drive Reserve

 Lawrance Hinde Park

 Lexington Drive Reserve

 Mataranka Drive Reserve

 Mudgeeraba Road Parklands

 Mudgeeraba Showgrounds

 Nabarlek Park

 Nancy Yaun Reserve

 Pioneer Downs Park

 Quambone Street Reserves

 Random Way Reserves

 San Fernando Dr Reserve

 Thomas Duncan Reserve

 Thredbo Rd Reserve

 Upper Worongary Creek Reserve

 Worangary Reservoir Parklands

 Worongary Creek Reserve

Events 
The Mudgeeraba Show Society runs an annual agricultural show known as the Mudgeeraba Show at the Showgrounds. It is held in June.

Attractions 
Gold Coast Light Horse Education Museum is at 8 Worongary Road beside the Mudgeeraba Showgrounds. The museum has information about the Australian Light Horse who served in the Second Boer War and World War I. It also has information on national service in Australia.

References

Sources

External links

 

Suburbs of the Gold Coast, Queensland